Beydağları Coastal National Park, a.k.a. Olympos Beydagları National Park, is a national park in Antalya Province, southern Turkey.

The national park was established on March 16, 1972, by a decret of the government. It stretches over an area of  beginning in Sarısu, located southwest of Antalya and reaching out to Cape Gelidonya  parallel to the Mediterranean Sea across the Kemer-Kumluca shoreline.

The ancient settlements Olympos, Phaselis and Idyros are situated within the national park, which lies between the shores of the ancient regions Pamphylia and Lycia. The tallest mountain in the park is Tahtalı Dağı. The Yanartaş burning gas field is found on the foothills of that mountain.

The national park offers place for activities such as beach and sea sports, picnic, camping, trekking, mountain climbing, paragliding etc. Visiting of the archeological sites within the national park is possible all around the year.

The park has a great biodiversity, it has over 865 plant species, 25 of which are endemic, from rare mammals can be found mountain goat, bobcat, caracal and wolf.

See also
 Olympos Aerial Tram

References

External links

National parks of Turkey
Turkish Riviera
Tourist attractions in Antalya Province
Geography of Antalya Province
1972 establishments in Turkey
Protected areas established in 1972